Marcos Baghdatis and Mikhail Youzhny were the defending champions but retired in the second round because of Baghdatis's foot injury.
Julian Knowle and Filip Polášek won the title, defeating Ivan Dodig and Mate Pavić 6–3, 6–3 in the final.

Seeds

Draw

Draw

References
 Main Draw

PBZ Zagreb Indoors - Doubles
2013 Doubles
2013 PBZ Zagreb Indoors